Zhang Yi (born January 30, 1987, in Chengdu, Sichuan) is a female Chinese triathlete. She competed at the 2008 Summer Olympics (Rank 42) and 2012 Summer Olympics.

See also
China at the 2012 Summer Olympics#Triathlon
Triathlon at the 2012 Summer Olympics – Women's

References

External links
 Profile

1987 births
Living people
Chinese female triathletes
Olympic triathletes of China
Sportspeople from Chengdu
Triathletes at the 2008 Summer Olympics
Triathletes at the 2012 Summer Olympics
Triathletes at the 2018 Asian Games
Asian Games competitors for China
20th-century Chinese women
21st-century Chinese women